Edward Kimball (1859–1938) was an American stage and silent film actor.

Edward Kimball may also refer to:

Edward L. Kimball (1930–2016), American legal scholar
Edward P. Kimball (1882–1937), American organist and hymnwriter
Ted Kimball (Edward Beatie Kimball, 1910–1985), American radio host
Edward Kimball (1823-1901), Sunday School teacher and church debt raiser

See also
Kimball (surname)